This is a complete list of the stage works of the Italian composer Lorenzo Ferrero (born 1951).

List

References

Sources
 Osmond-Smith, David (1997). 'Ferrero, Lorenzo' in The New Grove Dictionary of Opera, ed. Stanley Sadie. New York: Oxford University Press. .

External links
 Casa Ricordi Catalogue
 Casa Ricordi Digital Collection

 
Lists of operas by composer
Lists of compositions by composer